Islam Zazai (born 2 December 2002) is an Afghan cricketer. He made his first-class debut for Kabul Region in the 2019 Ahmad Shah Abdali 4-day Tournament on 16 April 2019.

References

External links
 

2002 births
Living people
Afghan cricketers
Kabul Eagles cricketers
Place of birth missing (living people)